Choucri Atafi (born December 8, 1981 in Bourg-en-Bresse, France) is an amateur Moroccan Greco-Roman wrestler, who competes in the men's heavyweight category. Atafi represented Morocco at the 2012 Summer Olympics in London, where he competed in the men's 96 kg class. He received a bye for the preliminary round of sixteen match, before losing to Tunisia's Hassine Ayari, with a three-set technical score (0–2, 1–0, 0–3), and a classification point score of 1–3.

In 2021, he competed at the 2021 African & Oceania Wrestling Olympic Qualification Tournament hoping to qualify for the 2020 Summer Olympics in Tokyo, Japan.

References

External links
Profile – International Wrestling Database
NBC Olympics Profile

1981 births
Living people
Moroccan male sport wrestlers
Olympic wrestlers of Morocco
Wrestlers at the 2012 Summer Olympics
French sportspeople of Moroccan descent
Sportspeople from Bourg-en-Bresse
French male sport wrestlers